Croatian Republic Football League was the highest football league in Croatia within the Yugoslav football system. During the time of SFR Yugoslavia, it was third level league for most of the time and the winner was usually promoted to Yugoslav Second League.

Winners
In SFR Yugoslavia

Amateur Championship
During 1968/69 and 1972/73 era, when four divisions of Yugoslav Second League were introduced, Croatian Republic league was not played as such. Clubs played in regional zones instead and the winners contested for Amateur Championship of SR Croatia. Winner was also promoted to Yugoslav Second League.

Football leagues in Croatia
4
Defunct third level football leagues in Europe